Jonathan Paul Bevan (born 20 June 1967) is an English professional golfer. He was captain of the victorious 2015 Great Britain and Ireland PGA Cup team.

Bevan won the Sunderland of Scotland Masters at Irvine in 2001, finishing four strokes ahead of Colin Gillies. The event was reduced to 54 holes after the final round was abandoned because of strong winds.

Bevan is currently attached to Sandwell Park Golf Club, having previously been at  Sherborne Golf Club, Rhos-on-Sea Golf Club, the Wessex Golf Centre in Weymouth, Dorset and Fynn Valley Golf Club in Ipswich.

Professional wins (1)
2001 Sunderland of Scotland Masters

Results in major championships

Bevan only played in The Open Championship.

CUT = missed the half-way cut
"T" = tied

Team appearances
PGA Cup (representing Great Britain and Ireland): 2007, 2009, 2015 (non-playing captain, winners)

References

External links

English male golfers
European Tour golfers
1967 births
Living people